Baron Béla Orczy de Orczi (16 January 1822 – 7 February 1917) was a Hungarian politician and freedom fighter, who served as Interior Minister between 1887 and 1889. He was also Minister of Home Defence for several months in 1884. He took part in the Hungarian Revolution of 1848, he fought against the rebelling Serbs in the area of Délvidék. He was the de facto Minister of Foreign Affairs between 1879 and 1890. His paternal grandfather was the poet .

References 
 Életrajza a Magyar Életrajzi Lexikonban (Hungarian)
 Életrajza a Magyar Országgyűlési Almanach 1906-1911-ben (Hungarian)
 Életrajza a Magyar Országgyűlési Almanach 1887-ben (Hungarian)

1822 births
1917 deaths
People from Pest, Hungary
Hungarian soldiers
Hungarian Interior Ministers
Defence ministers of Hungary
Foreign ministers of Hungary
Public Works and Transport ministers of Hungary
Judges royal
Bela
Knights Commander of the Order of Saint Stephen of Hungary